Southeast Babar is an Austronesian language spoken on Babar Island in South Maluku, Indonesia.

Phonology

Consonants 

 Sounds  only occur in loanwords.
  is only attested in loanwords and also infrequently in roots.

Vowels 

  are heard as more closed  when occurring before glides .

References

Further reading
Hein Steinhauer. 2009. The sounds of Southeast Babar. In Adelaar, K. Alexander and Pawley, Andrew (eds.), Austronesian historical linguistics and culture history: a festschrift for Robert Blust, 399-409. Canberra: Research School of Pacific and Asian Studies, Australian National University.

Babar languages
Languages of the Maluku Islands